Nea Kydonia is a former municipality in the Chania regional unit, Crete, Greece. Since the 2011 local government reform it is part of the municipality Chania, of which it is a municipal unit. It is situated on the western outskirts of Chania. It saw fierce fighting during the Battle of Crete during World War II and there the main prisoner of war camp for Allied soldiers in Western Crete was in Galatas.

The seat of the municipality of Nea Kydonia was in the village of Daratsos. Galatas has a popular beach at Kalamaki and a port called Kato Galatas. Agia Marina, Stalos and Daratso are other principal settlements of the municipality, as well as the uninhabited island of Agii Theodori. It was part of the former province of Kydonia.

Ancient History
Nearby in the modern city of Chania, is the ancient city of Kydonia, over whose ruins the modern city has been built.  Kydonia was a powerful Cretan city in the period 600 to 200 BC.

See also
List of settlements in the Chania regional unit
Chania Plain

Line notes

References
 National Statistical Service of Greece (ΕΣΥΕ). (Greek)
 C. Michael Hogan,  Cydonia, The Modern Antiquarian, Jan. 23, 2008

External links
Official site

Populated places in Chania (regional unit)